Phil Ek is an American record producer, engineer and mixer. Ek began his career in Seattle, Washington in the early 1990s recording live sound in clubs. He then moved into studio recording, recording small projects and demos for local bands. Around this time, Ek was frequently working with influential producer Jack Endino. Producing Built to Spill's second album, There's Nothing Wrong with Love, proved to be Ek's mainstream breakthrough (the album has since ranked in the Top Ten of Spin Magazine's top indie records of all time). Phil Ek has worked with such indie rock bands as Band of Horses, Fleet Foxes, Modest Mouse, The Shins, Built to Spill, Duster, 764-HERO, Big Business and Mudhoney.

Selected discography

References

External links
Phil Ek - Official website, includes discography
Interview, HitQuarters May 2009

Record producers from Washington (state)
Living people
Year of birth missing (living people)